Wuhan University School of Philosophy is a school for the study of philosophy in Wuhan University. Established in 1922, the school is part of the Faculty of Humanities. The School of Chinese Classics is currently under the supervision of the School of Philosophy.

Majors
Undergraduate
Philosophy (national key major), religious study, comparative philosophy, Chinese classics, psychology. 

Graduate 
Marxism philosophy, Chinese philosophy, comparative philosophy, foreign philosophy, logic, ethics, aesthetics, religious studies (Christian), science and technology philosophy, basic psychology.

References

External links
School of Philosophy

Wuhan University Faculty of Humanities